André Dej (born 6 February 1992) is a Polish-German professional footballer who plays as a midfielder for Rot Weiss Ahlen.

References

External links
 

1992 births
Living people
Footballers from Cologne
Polish footballers
Poland youth international footballers
German footballers
German people of Polish descent
Association football midfielders
3. Liga players
Regionalliga players
MSV Duisburg II players
Sportfreunde Siegen players
Sportfreunde Lotte players
SSV Jahn Regensburg players
FC Viktoria Köln players
Alemannia Aachen players
SC Fortuna Köln players
Rot Weiss Ahlen players
Polish expatriate footballers
Expatriate footballers in Germany
Polish expatriate sportspeople in Germany